Trigonopterus payungensis is a species of flightless weevil in the genus Trigonopterus from Indonesia.

Etymology
The specific name is derived from that of the type locality.

Description
Individuals measure  in length. Body is slightly hexagonal in shape. General coloration is black, with rust-colored tibiae, tarsi, and antennae.

Range

Phylogeny
T. payungensis is part of the T. dimorphus species group.

References

payungensis
Beetles described in 2014
Beetles of Asia
Insects of Indonesia